The Burlington–Bristol Bridge is a truss bridge with a lift span crossing the Delaware River from Burlington, New Jersey to Bristol Township, Pennsylvania in the United States. Construction of the bridge started on April 1, 1930, and the bridge opened to traffic on May 2, 1931. The bridge carries New Jersey Route 413 and Pennsylvania Route 413 (PA 413).

The two-lane bridge has a total length of 2,301 feet (701 m), and is operated by the Burlington County Bridge Commission.

The center span is lifted by the action of two large concrete slabs of slightly greater weight than the lifted span, which block traffic when fully down. They are set in downwards motion to lift the bridge by a very slight action of the motors, as gravity does the rest. In 2016, traffic signals and barrier gates were installed at each end of the bridge for stopping traffic when the draw span is being lifted.

A municipal garage is located underneath the rising road after the tollbooths. During times when the bridge is up for a boat passing underneath, large traffic backups are created on Keim Boulevard, the road that functions as the route to the bridge from U.S. Route 130 (US 130) and Broad Street.

The tollbooths are equipped with E-ZPass and the toll  — $4.00 for cars, or $3 with E-ZPass — is paid by vehicles crossing into Pennsylvania.

New bridges for the site have been proposed, but most would require the access ramp to extend out to US 130, which would result in the destruction of historic buildings, as well as the large industrial park near the bridge.

See also
List of crossings of the Delaware River

References

External links

Burlington-Bristol Bridge, Burlington County Bridge Commission
Philly Roads details for the Burlington-Bristol Bridge

Bridges over the Delaware River
Burlington, New Jersey
Toll bridges in New Jersey
Toll bridges in Pennsylvania
Vertical lift bridges in the United States
Vertical lift bridges in New Jersey
Bridges completed in 1931
1931 establishments in New Jersey
1931 establishments in Pennsylvania
Bridges in Burlington County, New Jersey
Bridges in Bucks County, Pennsylvania
Road bridges in New Jersey
Road bridges in Pennsylvania
Towers in Pennsylvania
Steel bridges in the United States
Interstate vehicle bridges in the United States